Fabián Alberto O'Neill Domínguez (14 October 1973 – 25 December 2022) was a Uruguayan professional footballer who played as a midfielder.

He began and finished his career at Nacional, where he won the Uruguayan Primera División in his debut season in 1992. He spent most of his career in Italy, mainly with Cagliari and also with Juventus and Perugia. He earned 19 caps for Uruguay, starting at the 1993 Copa América and ending at the 2002 FIFA World Cup.

Nicknamed "El Mago" ('The Wizard'), O'Neill was praised by numerous footballers and journalists for his ability and technique on the pitch, including Zinedine Zidane, who described him as the most talented teammate of his career. He lost his fortune to gambling, and suffered from alcoholism during and after his career, retiring at 29 and dying 20 years later.

Early life
O'Neill was the oldest of five children born to Luis Alberto O'Neill and Mercedes Domínguez. He was the great-great-grandson of Michael O'Neill, an Irishman from County Cork who arrived in Uruguay in 1837.

Abandoned by his parents, O'Neill was raised by his grandmother, with whom he had to share a bed until the age of 14. He began working at age nine, selling sausages outside a brothel, and was already drinking at that age.

Club career
O'Neill began his professional career at Nacional in the Uruguayan Primera División playing in the first team between 1992 and 1995. In his debut season, at the age of 18, his team won the league. In 1996, he moved to Italy to play with Serie A club Cagliari, one of several Uruguayans to join the club through agent Paco Casal. The club was relegated to Serie B in 1997, but promoted again in 1998. In 1999, during a game against Salernitana, he performed three nutmegs against the future World Cup winner, Gennaro Gattuso.

After Cagliari was relegated again in 2000, O'Neill was transferred to Juventus for a fee of 20 billion lire (€10 million). 
In January 2002 he moved to Perugia as part of a deal involving the transfer of Davide Baiocco to Juventus. He terminated his contract in the summer to return to Cagliari, now in Serie B, although he did not take to the field during his brief stay. In 2012, O'Neill admitted to twice having fixed Serie A games in order to win bets.

In January 2003, O'Neill returned to Nacional but played only five times. He retired later that year at the age of 29, due to the effects of alcoholism, and returned to his cattle ranch. He later played and managed semiprofessional football in the Uruguayan lower leagues.

International career
O'Neill played 19 times for Uruguay. He played his first match for the national team on 16 June 1993 in a Copa América group match won 1–0 against the United States. He came on as a substitute for Adrián Paz with seven minutes remaining, but took no further part in the tournament due to injury. The last of his 19 caps was in May 2002 against China in Shenyang. He was a member of the Uruguay squad at the 2002 FIFA World Cup but did not play.

Personal life and death
O'Neill had two daughters and a son, each of whom was born to a different mother. As of December 2021, his son Favio was playing as a defensive midfielder for the under-19 team of Peñarol, Nacional's rivals; as of June 2020, his middle child Martina was a field hockey player. His cousin Jairo (born 2001) also played for Peñarol.

In 2013, O'Neill wrote an autobiography, Hasta la última gota (Until the Last Drop). He had a gallbladder operation in June 2016 and was told to abstain from alcohol for three years, but began drinking a month later.

In February 2017, O'Neill said that he lost his fortune of US$14 million on "slow horses, fast women and gambling", but that he did not regret becoming poor. In his autobiography, he said that he once spent US$250,000 on 1,104 cows, having attended a cattle auction while drunk.

O'Neill was hospitalised in June 2020 with cirrhosis. He was advised that if he abstained from alcohol for a year, he could have a liver transplant and live to old age.

O'Neill died on 25 December 2022, at age 49, in a Montevideo hospital, where he had been in intensive care with bleeding due to chronic liver disease. He was cremated and his ashes were scattered in Paso de los Toros on 28 December.

Career statistics

Scores and results list Uruguay's goal tally first, score column indicates score after each O'Neill goal.

Honours
Nacional
 Uruguayan Primera División: 1992

References

External links 
 

1973 births
2022 deaths
People from Paso de los Toros
Uruguayan people of Irish descent
Uruguayan footballers
Cagliari Calcio players
Club Nacional de Football players
Expatriate footballers in Italy
2002 FIFA World Cup players
1993 Copa América players
Association football midfielders
Juventus F.C. players
A.C. Perugia Calcio players
Serie A players
Serie B players
Uruguayan Primera División players
Uruguay under-20 international footballers
Uruguay international footballers
Uruguayan expatriate footballers
Uruguayan expatriate sportspeople in Italy
Alcohol-related deaths in Uruguay
Deaths from liver disease